The Count of Vermandois was the ruler of the county of Vermandois.

Beneficiary counts of Vermandois
 Leodegar, Count of Vermandois (c. 484).
 Emerannus (c. 511), son of previous.
 Wagon I (c. 550).
 Wagon II (c. 600), son of previous.
 Bertrude, daughter of previous and wife of Clotaire II, added Vermandois to the royal domain.
 Garifrede (c. 660).
 Ingomar, Count of Vermandois (c. 680).

Beneficiary counts of Vermandois and abbots of Saint Quentin de Monte
 Bernard, son of Charles Martel, abbot of St Quentin de Monte (now Mont-Saint-Quentin near Péronne).
 Jerome, brother of previous, count of Vermandois and abbot of St Quentin de Monte (714–771).
 Fulrad son of previous, abbot of St Quentin de Monte (after 771).
 Guntard, Count of Vermandois (771–833) and then abbot of St Quentin de Monte (till 833).
 Hugh, son of Charlemagne, abbot of St Quentin de Monte (833–844).
 Adalard, Count of Vermandois, son of Gisla, granddaughter of Charlemagne, count of Vermandois (833–864) and then abbot of St Quentin de Monte (844–864).
 Baldwin Iron Arm abbot of St Quentin de Monte (864–879).
 Teutricius (864–886) and then abbot of St Quentin de Monte (879–886) or Theodoric, Count of Vermandois (c. 876), a descendant of Childebrand, brother of Charles Martel.

Carolingian counts
Pepin II of Vermandois, son of Bernard, King of Italy
 unknown
 Pepin III of Vermandois
Herbert I, Count of Vermandois, also count of Senlis
Herbert II, Count of Vermandois
Adalbert I, Count of Vermandois, lord of Péronne and St Quentin 
Herbert III, Count of Vermandois
Adalbert II, Count of Vermandois
Otto, Count of Vermandois 
Herbert IV, Count of Vermandois
Adelaide, Countess of Vermandois

Capetian counts
Hugh the Great, Count of Vermandois and Valois by marriage
Ralph I, Count of Vermandois
Ralph II, Count of Vermandois, son of Ralph I and Petronilla of Aquitaine
Elisabeth, Countess of Vermandois
Eleanor, Countess of Vermandois; died either childless or without any designated heirs, lands passed to French crown

Philip II of France added Vermandois to the royal domain.

Bourbon counts 
 Louis de Bourbon, comte de Vermandois (1669–1683), illegitimate son of Louis XIV and Louise de la Vallière, title held by appanage.

See also
 Vermandois

Notes

References

Sources
 Anselme, Histoire Genealogique de la Maison royale de France, 1726.
 M. Fouquier-Cholet, Histoire des Comtes héréditaires du Vermandois, Saint-Quentin, 1832.
 Ioh. Mabillon, Annales ord. Sancti Benedicti. Ticinense. Lucae, 1739.
 Louis Moreri, Le Gran Dictionnaire Historique, Paris, 1743–1749.

External links